Utricularia tenella is a terrestrial carnivorous plant that belongs to the genus Utricularia (family Lentibulariaceae). Its distribution includes areas in Western Australia, South Australia, Victoria, and Tasmania.

See also 
 List of Utricularia species

References 

Carnivorous plants of Australia
Flora of South Australia
Flora of Tasmania
Flora of Victoria (Australia)
Eudicots of Western Australia
tenella
Lamiales of Australia